Lebanon competed at the 2016 Winter Youth Olympics in Lillehammer, Norway from 12 to 21 February 2016. The Lebanese team consists of two athletes in two sports.

Competitors

Alpine skiing

Lebanon qualified one boy and one girl.

Boys

Girls

See also
Lebanon at the 2016 Summer Olympics

References

Nations at the 2016 Winter Youth Olympics
Lebanon at the Youth Olympics
2016 in Lebanese sport